Field cricket may refer to:
 Insect species
 In the British Isles a "field cricket" is the insect species Gryllus campestris;
 in North America it may refer to various species in the genus Gryllus;
 elsewhere, the term may be used for certain other genera in the Gryllinae;
 it could also apply to the field game cricket.
 The cricket field 
 The act of fielding (cricket) 

Insect common names